Ianthella basta is a species of fan-shaped sea sponge in the class Demospongiae. It is also known as the elephant ear sponge, paper sponge, or scroll sponge.

A sponge measuring 1.7 m in height and 9.5 m circumference has been estimated to be about 8 years old.

Distribution
The elephant ear sponge is found in the Indo-Pacific region. It is found on coral reefs in areas with rapid water flows.

Ianthella basta are introduced species they do not tend to invade other species territories and are noncompetitive.

Ecology
The sea cucumber (Synaptula lamperti) is closely associated with the sponge and makes use of certain nutrients exuded by it.

Research is being undertaken on various metabolites and other biologically active constituents that are synthesized by the sponge.

References

Verongimorpha
Fauna of the Indian Ocean
Fauna of the Pacific Ocean
Taxa named by Peter Simon Pallas
Animals described in 1766